Troschelia is a genus of sea snails, marine gastropod mollusks in the family Buccinidae, the true whelks.

Species
Species within the genus Troschelia include:
 Troschelia berniciensis (King, 1846)
Synonyms
 Troschelia (Thalassoplanes) Dall, 1908: synonym of Thalassoplanes Dall, 1908
 Troschelia (Thalassoplanes) moerchii Dall, 1908: synonym of Thalassoplanes moerchii (Dall, 1908) (basionym)
 Troschelia moerchii Dall, 1908: synonym of Thalassoplanes moerchii (Dall, 1908) (original combination)

References

External links
 Mörch, O. A. L. (1876). Description d'espèces nouvelles. Journal de Conchyliologie. 24: 368-374
 Sars, G.O. (1878). Bidrag til Kundskaben om Norges arktiske Fauna. I. Mollusca Regionis Arcticae Norvegiae. Oversigt over de i Norges arktiske Region Forekommende Bløddyr. Brøgger, Christiania. xiii + 466 pp., pls 1-34 & I-XVIII
 Gofas, S.; Le Renard, J.; Bouchet, P. (2001). Mollusca. in: Costello, M.J. et al. (eds), European Register of Marine Species: a check-list of the marine species in Europe and a bibliography of guides to their identification. Patrimoines Naturels. 50: 180-213.
 Bouchet, P. & Warén, A. (1985). Revision of the Northeast Atlantic bathyal and abyssal Neogastropoda excluding Turridae (Mollusca, Gastropoda). Bollettino Malacologico. supplement 1: 121-296.

Buccinidae
Monotypic gastropod genera